Syed Shamsul Haq (27 December 1935 – 27 September 2016) was a Bangladeshi writer. He was awarded Bangla Academy Literary Award in 1966 (the youngest among all to receive it), Ekushey Padak in 1984 and Independence Day Award in 2000 by the Government of Bangladesh for his contributions to Bangla literature. His notable works include "Payer Awaj Pawa Jai", "Nishiddho Loban", "Khelaram Khele Ja", "Neel Dongshon" and "Mrigoya".

Early life
Haq was born in Kurigram on 27 December 1935 to Syed Siddique Husain, a homeopathic physician, and Halima Khatun. He was the eldest of the eight children. In 1951, he went to Bombay to work as an assistant to film director Kamal Amrohi while he was making his film Mahal but left the job the next year.

Personal life
Haq was married to Anwara Syed Haq. She is a member of the Royal College of Psychiatrists in London. Together they have one daughter, Bidita Sadiq, and one son, Ditio Syed Haq.

On 27 September 2016, he died of lung cancer at the age of 80 in Dhaka.

Work
Haq wrote poetry, fiction, plays (mostly in verse), music lyrics and essays. His literary works were included in the curriculum of school level, secondary, higher secondary and graduation level Bengali literature in Bangladesh.

Haq also wrote songs, including "Jar Chaya Poreche Monero Aynate" and "Haire Manush Rongin Fanush".

Poetry

Novels

Stories

Films
 Phir Milengey Hum Dono (1966), screenwriter and director

Plays

Translations

Awards
 Bangla Academy Literary Award (1966)
 Adamjee Literary Award (1969)
 Alakta Gold Medal (1982)
 Alaol Literary Award (1983)
 Kabitalap Award (1983)
 Literary Award of the Association of Women Writers
 Ekushey Padak (1984)
 TENAS  Medal (1990)
 Jebunnessa-Mahbubullah Gold Medal (1985)
 Padabali Kabita  Award (1987)
 Nasiruddin Gold Medal (1990)
 National Poetry Award (1997)
 Independence Day Award (2000)
 National Poetry Honour (2001)
 Premchand Fellowship]] of Sahitya Akademi of India (2010)

References

Further reading
Golpo Songroho (Collected Stories), the national textbook of B.A. (pass and subsidiary) course  of Bangladesh, published by University of Dhaka in 1979 (reprint in 1986).
Bangla Sahitya (Bengali Literature), the national textbook of intermediate (college) level of Bangladesh published in 1996 by all educational boards.

External links
A Bangla-language Critique on His Novels
A review oh His Essay book

1935 births
2016 deaths
Bengali-language writers
Bangladeshi male poets
Bengali male poets
Bengali-language poets
Bangladeshi secularists
Recipients of the Ekushey Padak
Recipients of the Independence Day Award
Best Screenplay National Film Award (Bangladesh) winners
Recipients of Bangla Academy Award
Deaths from lung cancer
Recipients of the Adamjee Literary Award
Recipients of Mazharul Islam Poetry Award